Rataj is a Slavic surname. Notable people with the surname include:

 Igor Rataj (born 1973), Slovak ice hockey player
 Maciej Rataj (1884–1940), Polish politician and writer
 Mojca Rataj (born 1979), Bosnian alpine skier
 Tomáš Rataj (born 2003), Czech footballer

Slavic-language surnames